Teatro della Concordia (Theatre of Union), is located in Monte Castello di Vibio, of the Umbria region in Italy. It is the smallest theatre all'italiana in the world.

Design
The architectural plan of Teatro della Concordia is a bell shape, with deep narrow hall opening to a proscenium and stage, which is a typical Italian theater design.

The theatre has only 99 seats, which are distributed in 62 seats in boxes and 37 seats in the stalls. The theatre has public performances, and is regularly played.

History
19th century
The Teatro della Concordia was built at the beginning of the 19th century, during the epoch of the Napoleonic Wars invasion, by nine prosperous Umbrian families. They wanted to support cultural ideals beyond the French Revolution's goals, including: the spirit of freedom, equality and brotherhood. The new theatre was opened in 1808. The interior of the theatre was later decorated in 1892 with frescos by Luigi Agretti.

 
20th century
Due to a post-war (WW II) deteriorated condition, the building was closed in 1951. Thirty years later, in 1981, the municipality of Monte Castello di Vibio purchased the theatre and restored it under the direction of the architects Paolo Leonelli and Mario Struzzi. The Teatro della Concordia was reopened in 1993.  In the same year the association Società del Teatro della Concordia was founded.

In 1997 the Teatro della Concordia started a partnership with the Teatro Farnese of Parma. In 2008 the exhibition area Sala Espositiva Nello Latini was opened in the basement of the Teatro della Concordia on the occasion of its 200 Year Jubilee. Edoardo Brenci, the president of the Società del Teatro della Concordia, organizes every year series of events with stage productions, concerts, expositions, and other events.

Performances
Among the known artists who have given performances at the Teatro della Concordia are, inter alia, the Italian actress Gina Lollobrigida, as well as the Austrian classical guitarist Johanna Beisteiner.

Gallery

References

External links
Official Teatro della Concordia website — 
Italian Guidebook: Teatro della Concordia. — article

Theatres in Italy
Buildings and structures in Umbria
Commercial buildings completed in 1808
Tourist attractions in Umbria
19th-century architecture in Italy